Annunitum or Anunītu was a Mesopotamian goddess of war. While initially she functioned as an epithet of Ishtar (Sumerian Inanna), she started to develop into a separate deity in the final years of the Sargonic period and through the Ur III period. 

In later periods, she is best attested as the tutelary goddess of Sippar-Amnanum, where she was worshiped separately from Ishtar. She was also known from Uruk, Ur, Nippur, Babylon, Kisurra, and Mari. Her cult persisted at least until the final years of the neo-Babylonian period, and possibly even later, until the period of Seleucid rule over Mesopotamia.

Origin
Annunitum was initially an epithet of Ishtar of Agade highlighting the warlike aspect of her nature. Possible translations of it include "skirmisher" or "the martial one." However, as early as during the final years of the Sargonic period, Annunitum started to develop into a separate deity. She is attested as a fully independent figure in the Ur III period in the circle of deities associated with Inanna in Uruk, Ur and Nippur. It was suggested that Annuitium was an expanded form of the Semitic god Anūna.

Tonia Sharlach in her study of goddesses worshiped in the court of Shulgi, including Annunitum, notes that it might be more accurate to refer to the names Ishtar and Inanna as "something of an umbrella term" designating multiple interconnected deities. For example, a collection of hymns from the Ur III period treats Inanna of Uruk, Inanna of Zabalam and Inanna of Ulmash (the Akkadian Ishtar) as three separate deities, with separate compositions dedicated to each, while in Babylon in the Old Babylonian period, Annunitum, Ishtar and Inanna of Zabalam occur as three separate goddesses. Sharlach suggests that to accommodate this information, the study of "forms" of Ishtar in Mesopotamian sources requires relying on a methodology developed by Gary Beckman for the purpose of study of deities designated by the logogram dIŠTAR in Hittite texts, such as the Hurrian Shaushka. As summarized by Beckman, "in some respects (...) Ištar-figures partake of a common essence, while in others they are distinct." He also notes that "any special features of the varieties will become apparent only if each is initially studied in isolation." A number of forms of Ishtar attested in Mesopotamian texts appear to be regional in character. For example, Akusitum, patronized by the Manana dynasty of Kish, was called the "Ishtar of Akus," dINANNA-a-ku-sumki. Another such "Ishtar" might have been the goddess Lakuppitu, who according to Andrew R. George was likely initially designated as "Ishtar of Lagaba." She was an underworld deity associated with Nergal, as attested in sources from Isin. 

Annunitum was not the only epithet of Ishtar who developed into a separate goddess. Urkitum, worshiped in neo-Babylonian Uruk as a distinct goddess and closely associated with Uṣur-amāssu,  was in origin an epithet of Ishtar meaning "the Urukean."  Another example is Telītu (Akkadian: "The Skilled One"), who started to be viewed as a distinct goddess in the first millennium BCE,  even though she was in origin an epithet of Ishtar. The process of epithets evolving into separate deities is also known in the case of medicine goddesses, as Gula was likely an epithet of another goddess in origin.

Character and iconography
Annunitum was regarded as a warlike goddess. She exemplified the martial side of Ishtar. She was also the tutelary goddess of Sippar-Amnanum,  modern Tell ed-Der, located next to ancient Sippar-Yahrurum, modern Abu Habbah, which in antiquity was a cult center of Shamash and his wife Aya.  These twin cities are usually referred to simply as Sippar. The epithet Šarrat-Sipparim, "queen of Sippar," could be applied both to Annunitum and Ishtar. 

A cylinder seal from Sippar assumed to depict Annunitum shows her holding a trident-like weapon and in the company of another goddess, likely Aya. Another possible depiction of Annunitum on a cylinder seal shows her standing on the back of two addorsed lion-griffons. She could also be depicted in a robe leaving one shoulder and breast exposed, similar to Ishtar and Aya on seals from the same city. It is assumed that this garment was meant to highlight beauty, charm and sex appeal. 

In astronomical texts Annunitum was associated with the constellation Pisces.

Worship
Earliest attestations of Annunitum come from the Sargonic period. Naram-Sin referred to "Ishtar-Annunitum" as his personal deity, and apparently after his deification was considered to be married to her. A mace head dedicated to Ishtar-Anunnitum by Rimush has been found in Assur. Shar-kali-sharri recorded establishing a new temple for Annunitum in Babylon in one of his year names: "In the year when Shar-kali-sharri laid [the foundations] [of the] temple of Annunıtum [and of the] temple of Ilaba in Babylon ...".

In the Ur III period, Annunitum appears in the archive of queen Shulgi-simti, one of the wives of Shulgi of Ur. Festivals held in her honor in this city included nabrium, held in fall, a banquet (kaš-dé-a) held in summer, and elūnum, the nature of which is uncertain. A shrine dedicated to her existed near Eresh, though it was closed down at some point in the third decade of Shulgi's reign. Another document mentions staff of temples of Annunitum, Allani and Shuwala.

Material from Ur from the reign of Shulgi indicates that Annunitum was commonly worshiped alongside Ulmašītum, Belet-Šuḫnir and Belet-Terraban. Ulmašītum was a name referring to Ishtar of Agade, derived from her temple E-Ulmash, and it is assumed she and Annunitum were similar in character. However, E-Ulmash was also the name of Annunitum's temple in Sippar. It has been proposed that some unexplained temple names, including E-Ulmash, might reflect situations in which a major Mesopotamian deity, like Ninurta or Ishtar, were superimposed over a preexisting one whose name was only preserved in the name of the temple, but this theory lacks evidence other than the presence of names with phrases like Ulmash seemingly functioning as a theophoric element, which can simply be explained as the temple name itself being regarded as divine, rather than by existence of otherwise unattested deities Ulmash or Shumesha. E-Ulmash in Sippar was rebuilt at least twice, by the Old Babylonian king Ammi-Saduqa and later by Nabonidus. A temple dedicated to Annunitum also existed in Agade, but its name is not fully preserved in known texts. Other known temples of Annunitum include the E-mesigakalammasharra (Sumerian: "house of all the given me of the land") in Babylon, and E-saggasharra ("foremost house of the universe") from the same city. Furthermore, kings Shu-Sin of Ur and Itur-Shamash of Kisurra also built temples of Annunitum, but neither their names nor locations are known. She is also mentioned in passing in the seal inscription of Zardamu, king of Karahar, alongside Nergal, Šulpae, Ensignun, Tammuz, Ishtar and at least one deity whose name is not preserved.

In the Old Babylonian period, Annunitum was among the goddesses most frequently mentioned in letters, next to Ishtar, Gula, Ninsianna, Aya and Zarpanit. In Nippur she received offerings in the Ekur temple complex, as attested in an offering list from the reign of Damiq-ilishu of Isin. In Sippar she was worshiped separately from Ishtar, whose temple was E-edina. In documents from this city, Annunitum is one of the three goddesses who can appear as the sole divine witnesses mentioned in customary formulas, the other two being Aya and Mamu (also spelled Mamud), the goddess of dreams and daughter of Shamash. One historically notable member of Annunitum's clergy from Sippar was Ur-Utu, chief lamentation priest (kalamāḫu) from Sippar-Amnanum, whose archive is considered an important resource in the study of Ninsianna. 

Annunitum was also worshiped in Mari in the Old Babylonian period. There is evidence that during Zimri-Lim's during some festivals she received the same number of sacrifices as the eight other most honored gods: the local god Itūr-Mēr, Dagan, Belet Ekallim, Nergal, Shamash, Ea, Ninhursag and Addu. A similarly named and possibly related goddess, Annu, appears in theophoric names from Mari comparably often to Ishtar and Ishara. Wolfgang Heimpel proposes that in Mari, Annunitum was closely associated with Belet Ekallim (Ninegal), possibly due to their shared connection with Ishtar. The latter goddess, while distinct in origin, has been described as an "Inanna figure" in scholarship. 

While it is known that Annunitum was worshiped in Uruk in the Ur III period, later references to her from this city are relatively late, and include a mention of pontiff (šangǔ) of this goddess from the reign of Nabu-apla-iddina and a neo-Assyrian letter mentioning that some sort of repair work pertaining to her, as well as to the deities Kurunnitu and dIGI.DU, had to be undertaken in the temple workshop of Uruk. 

Annunitum continued to be worshiped in Babylonia until the end of the neo-Babylonian period. It is possible a single reference to her is present in a ritual text from Seleucid Uruk, but the restoration of the name is uncertain.

References

Bibliography

Mesopotamian goddesses
War goddesses
Inanna